Achaeopsis spinulosa, the hotlips spider crab, is a species of crab in the family Inachidae, found only around the South African coast. It is the only species in the genus Achaeopsis.

Distribution
It is endemic to this region.

Description

Achaeopsis spinulosa is commonly known as the hotlips spider crab because of the vivid red marking around its mouth. It is a small spider crab with relatively long but quite sturdy legs. Its carapace is rounded, tapering to a blunt tip. Its pincers are raggedly striped in white and red.

Ecology
The crab decorates its body with sponges, hydroids, or algae, improving its camouflage. It is seldom seen without some form of decoration. It is often found among striped anemones and on sea fans.

References

Majoidea
Monotypic crustacean genera